The Queensboro Plaza station (originally named Queensboro Bridge Plaza station or simply Bridge Plaza station) is an elevated New York City Subway station at Queens Plaza (originally called Queensboro Bridge Plaza or simply Bridge Plaza) in the Long Island City neighborhood of Queens. It is near the east end of the Queensboro Bridge, with Queens Boulevard running east from the plaza. The station is served by the 7 and N trains at all times, the W train on weekdays, and the <7> train rush hours in the peak direction.

Queensboro Plaza was originally built in 1916–1917 as part of the Dual Contracts between the Brooklyn–Manhattan Transit Corporation (BMT) and the Interborough Rapid Transit Company (IRT). The station initially had eight tracks to allow BMT and IRT passengers to transfer between the Astoria, Flushing, and Second Avenue elevated lines. The northern section of the station was closed in the late 1940s and demolished in 1964. Queensboro Plaza now contains only four tracks: two each for the IRT Flushing Line and the BMT Astoria Line.

Today, Queensboro Plaza is the only station in the entire system to provide cross-platform transfers between "A" Division and "B" Division trains. While the station is near the Queens Plaza underground subway station, which serves the IND Queens Boulevard Line, the two stations are separate and do not allow free transfers.

History

Dual Contracts 

The New York Public Service Commission adopted plans for what was known as the Broadway–Lexington Avenue route (later the Broadway Line) in Manhattan on December 31, 1907. A proposed Tri-borough system was adopted in early 1908. Operation of Manhattan's Broadway Line was assigned to the Brooklyn Rapid Transit Company (BRT, subsequently the Brooklyn–Manhattan Transit Corporation or BMT) in the Dual Contracts, adopted on March 4, 1913. The Dual Contracts also included opening the Steinway Tunnel, an incomplete tunnel between the New York City boroughs of Manhattan and Queens. The Steinway Tunnel would be operated by the Interborough Rapid Transit Company (IRT).

The Dual Contracts negotiations had been intricate and sometimes fractious. The IRT had initially been loath to let the BRT operate its Broadway Line through Midtown Manhattan, but relented when negotiators offered the BRT all of the proposed lines in the planned dual system. In Queens, which heretofore had no subway service, two lines had been proposed, both extending from an interchange station (later Queensboro Plaza) in Long Island City. The shorter Astoria Line would run to Astoria in northwestern Queens, while the longer Flushing Line would be built initially to Corona, and eventually to Flushing, in north-central Queens. As part of the Dual Contracts, the IRT was given ownership of both lines, but the BRT was given trackage rights over the routes, allowing both companies to share revenue from their Queens operations.

The Queensboro Plaza station was built as an eight-track station, with four tracks across two levels. Each company took two tracks on each level. The southern half of the station, which opened on November 16, 1916, served trains of the IRT. The northern half of the station opened on February 1, 1917, serving BMT trains. In general, BRT trains were wider and longer than those on the IRT, and the Queens lines were built so that they could only fit the narrower IRT trains. The IRT had direct service into Manhattan via the Steinway Tunnel, as well as via the Queensboro Bridge to the Second Avenue elevated line. However, BRT trains from the 60th Street Tunnel and the Broadway Line in Manhattan could not run north or east of Queensboro Plaza, as they were wider. Consequently, BRT trains from Manhattan had to terminate on the northern side of the station, where cross-platform interchanges were available to narrower BRT shuttle trains that could run in Queens.

The city government took over the BMT's operations on June 1, 1940, and the IRT's operations on June 12, 1940. In 1942, the IRT Second Avenue Line closed, and the upper portion of the north side was abandoned.

The service on the Flushing and Astoria lines east of Queensboro Plaza was shared by the IRT and BMT until 1949. BMT trains on the Flushing Line were designated 9, while IRT services on that line were designated 7 on maps only. BMT and IRT trains on the Astoria Line were both designated 8. The IRT routes were given numbered designations in 1948 with the introduction of "R-type" rolling stock, which contained rollsigns with numbered designations for each service. The route from Times Square to Flushing became known as the 7.

Service changes and station modifications 
On October 17, 1949, the $1.375 million renovation of the station was completed which allowed the rerouting of trains between Manhattan and Queens. As part of the project, the Astoria Line platforms were shaved back to allow BMT service to operate through to 60th Street, and new connections were built between the 60th Street Tunnel approach and the west tracks at the east (former IRT) platforms, and the west (former BMT) platforms were closed. Once the project was completed, the IRT started using the Flushing Line only and the BMT started using the Astoria Line only. With the station's renovation, it became easier for passengers to transfer between the IRT and BMT lines. Instead of having to climb between the upper and lower level platforms, passengers were able to use cross-platform transfers. There was a crossover just west of the station which allowed the Astoria trains to access the Steinway tunnels. This was removed directly after the joint operation ceased in 1949. Much of the mezzanine was rebuilt as part of the project, including the pedestrian bridges leading to either side of Queens Plaza. On the north side of the lower level, a new window wall was constructed.

After the end of BMT/IRT dual service, the BMT's Astoria Shuttle was replaced with service from the 2 Fourth Avenue Line (later the RR train, then the R train), operating from Astoria–Ditmars Boulevard to Bay Ridge–95th Street in Brooklyn at all times. the New York City Board of Transportation announced that platforms on the Flushing Line would be lengthened to 11 IRT car lengths. The platforms at the other Flushing Line stations were extended in 1955–1956 to accommodate 11-car trains. However, nine-car trains continued to run on the 7 route until 1962, when they were extended to ten cars. With the opening of the 1964 New York World's Fair, trains were lengthened to eleven cars. 

In 1964, the abandoned northern half of the Queensboro Plaza station was demolished. One set of crossovers remains on the upper level as the Flushing Line's only connection to the rest of the system. This connection is used for non-revenue moves, specifically to transfer subway cars to the Coney Island Shops for repairs, to transfer new cars to the Flushing Line, or to move rolling stock to or from the Flushing line.

In 1981, the MTA listed the station among the 69 most deteriorated stations in the subway system. The R train's northern terminal was swapped with that of the N in 1987, so the N went to Ditmars Boulevard and the R went to 71st Avenue. This station was renovated in the late 1990s, and the contract for the project's design was awarded in May 1994. The W train started serving the Astoria Line, including the Queensboro Plaza station, in 2001. The W was discontinued in June 2010 and replaced with the Q until November 2016, when the W was restored.

In 2018, it was announced that the Queensboro Plaza station may receive elevators as part of a process to expand the New York City Subway system's accessibility. , funding had been committed to accessibility renovations at the Queensboro Plaza station. Accessibility improvements at Queensboro Plaza were approved in December 2021, and the MTA began preliminary work shortly afterward, with plans to complete the project in 2024. The work will include a new elevator from the south side of Queens Plaza to the mezzanine and a second elevator from the mezzanine to the platforms. The elevator from the platform will lead to the mezzanine extension. The project will also install new platform edges with ADA boarding areas, an ADA ramp at mezzanine level, additional digital information screens, and new CCTV and public address systems. Separately, in February 2022, developer Grubb Properties filed plans for a 26-story apartment tower at 25-01 Queens Plaza North; the project will include an elevator between the north side of Queens Plaza and the mezzanine.

Station layout 

This two-level station has two island platforms (one on each level) and four tracks. It stands over the south (railroad east) side of the roadway, but formerly spanned the whole plaza. Trains running into Queens stop on the upper level and Manhattan-bound trains below. On both levels, the BMT Astoria Line (which to the south joins with the 60th Street Tunnel Connection and heads through the 60th Street Tunnel to the BMT Broadway Line) uses the north track and the IRT Flushing Line uses the south track.

In 2014, the station was renovated by NYCTA employees (as opposed to an outside contractor). A computer assisted tower was installed on the south end, as part of the IRT Flushing Line automation.

Track layout

In the original configuration, the station had eight tracks and four tracks per each level. Originally, the IRT used both sides of the current platforms, and the BMT used now-demolished platforms north of the current platforms, also double-decked. The south side of the IRT platforms was used by the Flushing Line, as today. The north side was used by Astoria trains, but instead of going through the 60th Street Tunnel, they went over the Queensboro Bridge to the elevated IRT Second Avenue Line. Double crossovers south (lower tracks) and north (upper tracks) of the platforms allowed trains from either side to switch to the other line after leaving the station.

At the BMT half, the south track served subway trains to Manhattan and the BMT Broadway Line. By 1924, trains came from Manhattan on the upper level, continued north to a merge with the lower level, and then returned via the lower level. Before that, trains reversed direction using a double crossover south of the platforms. Since the platforms were IRT-size, the BMT used its own elevated cars to provide service on the lines, with a required transfer at Queensboro Plaza. Shuttles from Astoria came in on the west side lower track and then reversed direction to head to Flushing; Flushing trains came in on the upper track and reversed direction towards Astoria.

During the early period of dual service on the Astoria and Flushing portions, IRT and BMT trains had their own stopping marks on the platforms and the sections of the platforms were separated. Passengers had separate entrances to the platforms depending on which service they wanted. This set-up prevented free transfers between the trains of the two companies. This arrangement had to end when the IRT lengthened trains. The two companies worked out an agreement in which the revenue collected on those stations was shared.

After 1949, the track layout around the station was greatly simplified. Only the original southern side of the Queensboro Plaza station remains in service, with two tracks on each level. Queens-bound trains use the upper level, while Manhattan-bound trains use the lower level. BMT trains use the northern tracks on each level and IRT trains use the southern tracks. A double crossover remains on the upper level.

Exits
The station's only exits are through a mezzanine located below the lower level (and formerly connected to the now torn-down BMT platforms to the west). From the mezzanine, there is a concrete ramp across Queens Plaza North to the second floor of a building. There is also an overpass leading to Queens Plaza South.

In popular culture 

Queensboro Plaza is featured in a defining moment in the film Beneath the Planet of the Apes. The protagonist astronaut ("Brent") unknowingly enters the ruins of an underground station; upon seeing the words "Queensboro Plaza" in tiles, and finding an advertisement for the New York Summer Festival, he realizes that he is indeed on Earth and not another planet, and that New York City has been destroyed in a nuclear war. In reality, Queensboro Plaza is an elevated station and has no tilework.

The station is also featured in the Seinfeld episode entitled "The Cigar Store Indian", as the location of a renowned gyro stall, and again incorrectly depicted as an underground station, on an IRT Lexington Avenue Line  train.

The station is also incorrectly depicted as an underground station in an episode of Brooklyn Nine-Nine.

The station and nearby MetLife Plaza were a regular CG composite as location shots between scenes in ABC series Ugly Betty.

The station also appears briefly in the season 2 opening sequence of HBO political drama The Newsroom.

The station is also shown in the TV show The King of Queenss theme song, which shows a Redbird 7 train entering the station's upper level.

The station also appears on Sesame Street in a looking for triangles film with Maria (Sonia Manzano).

A shot of the station appears in the 2020 Pixar movie Soul.

Gallery

References

External links 

 
 The Subway Nut — Queensboro Plaza Pictures
 MTA's Arts For Transit — Queensboro Plaza
 Queens Plaza North entrance from Google Maps Street View
 Queens Plaza South entrance from Google Maps Street View
 Upper level from Google Maps Street View
 Lower level from Google Maps Street View

IRT Flushing Line stations
BMT Astoria Line stations
New York City Subway transfer stations
New York City Subway stations in Queens, New York
Railway stations in the United States opened in 1916
Railway stations in the United States opened in 1917
Long Island City
1916 establishments in New York City
1917 establishments in New York City